The 1997 Peterborough City Council election took place on 7 May 1997 to elect members of Peterborough City Council in England. This was on the same day as other local elections.

The whole council was up for election on new ward boundaries and the number of seats increased by 8.

Election result

References

1997
1990s in Cambridgeshire
Peterborough